The Immediate Geographic Region of Manhuaçu is one of the 10 immediate geographic regions in the Intermediate Geographic Region of Juiz de Fora, one of the 70 immediate geographic regions in the Brazilian state of Minas Gerais and one of the 509 of Brazil, created by the National Institute of Geography and Statistics (IBGE) in 2017.

Municipalities 
It comprises 24 municipalities.

 Abre Campo     
 Alto Caparaó     
 Alto Jequitibá      
 Caparaó     
 Caputira     
 Chalé (Minas Gerais)    
 Conceição de Ipanema      
 Durandé     
 Ipanema (Minas Gerais)      
 Lajinha      
 Luisburgo     
 Manhuaçu    
 Manhumirim      
 Martins Soares      
 Matipó     
 Mutum (Minas Gerais)   
 Pocrane    
 Reduto      
 Santa Margarida (Minas Gerais)      
 Santana do Manhuaçu      
 São João do Manhuaçu   
 São José do Mantimento   
 Simonésia     
 Taparuba

References 

Geography of Minas Gerais